Bolton Rural District was a short-lived rural district in the administrative county of Lancashire. It was created by the Local Government Act 1894 and comprised an area surrounding, but not including, the County Borough of Bolton. The district was abolished when the borough was extended in 1898.

The rural district was the successor to the Bolton Rural Sanitary District, which had been created in 1872. Whereas Bolton RSD was governed by a sanitary authority consisting of the local poor law guardians, the rural district was administered by the directly elected Bolton Rural District Council.

Parishes

The district consisted of seventeen civil parishes:

Abolition
The district was abolished under the Bolton, Turton and Westhoughton Extension Act. Its area was distributed between the county borough and the urban districts of Turton and Westhoughton as follows:

County Borough of Bolton: entire parishes of Breightmet, Darcy Lever, Deane, Great Lever, Lostock, Middle Hulton, Smithills, and Tonge, and the Daubhill area of Over Hulton.
Turton Urban District: Belmont, Bradshaw, Edgworth, Entwistle, Harwood, Longworth and Quarlton
Westhoughton Urban District: the remainder of Over Hulton.

References

Districts of England created by the Local Government Act 1894
History of the Metropolitan Borough of Bolton
Rural districts of England